The  is a Shingon Buddhist temple of the Kōyasan sect in Mitoyo, Kagawa, Japan. 
It was established by Emperor Heizei's instruction in 807. Hayagriva is a principal image now. The temple has undergone several reconstruction efforts since its founding, such as the rebuilding of its Main Hall (which is a National Treasure of Japan) in 1300.

Motoyama-ji is temple No.70 in the Shikoku Pilgrimage.

Building list 
Main Hall - National Treasure of Japan. It was rebuilt in 1300.
Sanmon (Niō Gate) - Important Cultural Property. Zen'yō. It was rebuilt in 1147.
Pagoda - It was rebuilt in 1913.
Daishidō
Gomadō
Chinjudō - Cultural Property of Kagawa prefecture. It was rebuilt in 1547 (Muromachi period).
Amidadō
Jūōdō
Dainichidō
Ireidō
Kyakuden
Bell tower
Kuri

See also
National Treasures of Japan
List of National Treasures of Japan (temples)

Gallery

External links 

https://web.archive.org/web/20110718212324/http://www.city.mitoyo.lg.jp/forms/info/info.aspx?info_id=457
 70番札所 本山寺 (Japanese)
  Download PDF (10MB) - Tourism Shikoku

9th-century establishments in Japan
National Treasures of Japan
Important Cultural Properties of Japan
Pagodas in Japan
Shingon Buddhism
Kōyasan Shingon temples
Buddhist temples in Kagawa Prefecture
Religious buildings and structures completed in 807